John André (2 May 1750/1751 – 2 October 1780) was a major in the British Army and head of its Secret Service in America during the American Revolutionary War. He was hanged as a spy by the Continental Army for assisting Benedict Arnold's attempted surrender of the fort at West Point, New York, to the British. André is typically remembered favorably by historians as a man of honor, and several prominent U.S. leaders of the time, including Alexander Hamilton and the Marquis de Lafayette, did not agree with his fate.

Early life and education
André was born on 2 May in 1750 or 1751 in London to wealthy Huguenot parents Antoine André, a merchant from Geneva, Switzerland, and Marie Louise Girardot from Paris. He was educated at St Paul's School, Westminster School, and in Geneva. He was briefly engaged to Honora Sneyd. In 1771, at age 20 he joined the army, first being commissioned second lieutenant in the 23rd Regiment (Royal Welch Fuziliers) but soon exchanging as lieutenant in the 7th Regiment of Foot (Royal Fuzileers). He was on leave of absence in Germany for nearly two years, and in 1774 joined his regiment in British Canada.

Career
During the early days of the American Revolutionary War, before independence was declared by the Thirteen Colonies, André was captured at Fort Saint-Jean by Continental General Richard Montgomery in November 1775, and held prisoner at Lancaster, Pennsylvania. He lived in the home of Caleb Cope, enjoying the freedom of the town, as he had given his word not to escape. In December 1776 he was freed in a prisoner exchange. He was promoted to captain in the 26th Foot on 18 January 1777. In 1777 he was aide-de-camp to Major-General Grey, serving thus on the expedition to Philadelphia, and at Brandywine and Germantown. In September, 1778, he accompanied Gen. Grey in the New Bedford expedition, and was sent back to Sir Henry Clinton as despatch bearer. On Gen. Grey's return to England, André was appointed aide-de-camp to Clinton with the rank of major.

He was a great favorite in colonial society, both in Philadelphia and New York, during those cities' occupation by the British Army. He had a lively and pleasant manner and could draw, paint, and create silhouettes, as well as sing and write verse. He was a prolific writer who carried on much of the correspondence of General Henry Clinton, the British Commander-in-Chief of British armies in America. He was fluent in English, French, German, and Italian. He also wrote many comic verses. He planned the Mischianza when General Howe, Clinton's precursor, resigned and was about to return to England.

During his nearly nine months in Philadelphia, André occupied Benjamin Franklin's house, from which it has been claimed that he removed several valuable items on the orders of Major-General Charles Grey when the British left Philadelphia, including an oil portrait of Franklin by Benjamin Wilson. Grey's descendants returned Franklin's portrait to the United States in 1906, the bicentennial of Franklin's birth. The painting now hangs in the White House.

Intelligence work

Head of British Secret Service in America
In 1779, André became Adjutant General of the British Army in North America with the rank of Major. In April of that year, he took charge of British Secret Service in America. By the next year (1780), he had briefly taken part in Clinton's invasion of the South, starting with the siege of Charleston, South Carolina.

Around this time, André had been negotiating with disillusioned U.S. general Benedict Arnold. Arnold's Loyalist wife Peggy Shippen was one of the go-betweens in the correspondence. Arnold commanded West Point and had agreed to surrender it to the British for £20,000 (approximately £3.62 million in 2021).

André went up the Hudson River on the British sloop-of-war Vulture on Wednesday, 20 September 1780 to visit Arnold. The presence of the warship was discovered by two American privates, John Peterson and Moses Sherwood, the following morning on 21 September. From their position at Teller's Point, they began to assail the Vulture and a longboat associated with it with rifle and musket fire. Pausing to secure more aid, Peterson and Sherwood headed to Fort Lafayette at Verplanck's Point to request cannons and ammunition from their commander, Colonel James Livingston. While they were gone, a small boat furnished by Arnold was steered to the Vulture by Joshua Hett Smith. At the oars were two brothers, tenants of Smith's who reluctantly rowed the boat  on the river to the sloop. Despite Arnold's assurances, the two oarsmen sensed that something was wrong. None of these men knew Arnold's purpose or suspected his treason; all were told that the purpose was to do good for the American cause. Only Smith was told anything specific, and that was the lie that it was to secure vital intelligence for the American cause. The brothers finally agreed to row after threats by Arnold to arrest them. They picked up André and placed him on shore. The others left and Arnold came to André on horseback, leading an extra horse for André's use.

The two men conferred in the woods below Stony Point on the river's west bank until nearly dawn, after which André accompanied Arnold several miles to the Joshua Hett Smith House (Treason House) in West Haverstraw, New York, owned by Thomas Smith and occupied by his brother Joshua. On the morning of 22 September, the two Americans, Peterson and Sherwood, launched a two-hour cannonade on the Vulture, which sustained many hits and was forced to retire downriver. Their repulsion of the British sloop effectively stranded André on shore.

Taken into custody
To aid André's escape through U.S. lines, Arnold provided him with civilian clothes and a passport which allowed him to travel under the name John Anderson. He bore six papers hidden in his stocking, written in Arnold's hand, that showed the British how to take the fort. Joshua Hett Smith, who was accompanying him, left him just before he was captured.

André rode on in safety until 9 a.m. on 23 September, when he came near Tarrytown, New York, where armed militiamen John Paulding, Isaac Van Wart and David Williams stopped him.

André thought that they were Tories because one was wearing a Hessian soldier's overcoat. "Gentlemen," he said, "I hope you belong to our party." "What party?" asked one of the men. "The lower party", replied André, meaning the British. "We do" was the answer. André then told them that he was a British officer who must not be detained, when, to his surprise, they said that they were Continentals and that he was their prisoner. He then told them that he was a US officer and showed them his passport, but the suspicions of his captors were now aroused. They searched him and found Arnold's papers in his stocking. Only Paulding could read and Arnold was not initially suspected. André offered them his horse and watch to let him go, but they declined. André testified at his trial that the men searched his boots for the purpose of robbing him. Paulding realized that he was a spy and took him to Continental Army headquarters in Sand's mill (in today's Armonk, New York, a hamlet within North Castle situated on the Connecticut border of Westchester County).

The prisoner was at first detained at Wright's Mill in North Castle, before being taken back across the Hudson to the headquarters of the American army at Tappan, where he was held at a tavern today known as the '76 House. There he admitted his true identity.

At first, all went well for André since post commandant Lieutenant Colonel John Jameson decided to send him to Arnold, never suspecting that a high-ranking hero of the Revolution could be a turncoat. But Major Benjamin Tallmadge, head of Continental Army Intelligence, arrived and persuaded Jameson to bring the prisoner back. He offered intelligence showing that a high-ranking officer was planning to defect to the British but was unaware of who it was.

Jameson sent General George Washington the six sheets of paper carried by André, but he was unwilling to believe that Arnold could be guilty of treason. He therefore insisted on sending a note to Arnold informing him of the entire situation. Jameson did not want his army career to be ruined later for having wrongly believed that his general was a traitor. Arnold received Jameson's note while at breakfast with his officers, made an excuse to leave the room, and was not seen again. The note gave Arnold time to escape to the British. An hour or so later, Washington arrived at West Point with his party and was disturbed to see the stronghold's fortifications in such neglect, part of the plan to weaken West Point's defenses. Washington was further irritated to find that Arnold had breached protocol by not being present to greet him. Some hours later, Washington received the explanatory information from Tallmadge and immediately sent men to arrest Arnold, but it was too late.

According to Tallmadge's account of the events, he and André conversed during the latter's captivity and transport. André wanted to know how he would be treated by Washington. Tallmadge had been a classmate of Nathan Hale while both were at Yale, and he described the capture of Hale. André asked whether Tallmadge thought the situations similar; he replied, "Yes, precisely similar, and similar shall be your fate", referring to Hale having been hanged by the British as a spy.

Trial and execution

Washington convened a board of senior officers to investigate the matter. The trial contrasted with Sir William Howe's treatment of Hale some four years earlier. The board consisted of Major Generals Nathanael Greene (presiding officer), Lord Stirling, Arthur St. Clair, Lafayette (who cried at André's execution), Robert Howe, Steuben, Brigadier Generals Samuel H. Parsons, James Clinton, Henry Knox, John Glover, John Paterson, Edward Hand, Jedediah Huntington, John Stark, and Judge Advocate General John Laurance.

André's defense was that he was suborning an enemy officer, "an advantage taken in war" (his words). However, he did not attempt to pass the blame onto Arnold. André told the court that he had neither desired nor planned to be behind American lines. He also asserted that, as a prisoner of war, he had the right to escape in civilian clothes. On 29 September 1780, the board found André guilty of being behind American lines "under a feigned name and in a disguised habit" and ordered that "Major André, Adjutant-General to the British Army, ought to be considered as a Spy from the enemy, and that agreeable to the law and usage of nations, it is their opinion, he ought to suffer death."

Glover was officer of the day at André's execution. Sir Henry Clinton, the British commander in New York, did all that he could to save André, his favorite aide, but refused to surrender Arnold in exchange for him, even though he personally despised Arnold. André appealed to George Washington to be executed as a gentleman by being shot rather than hanged as a "common criminal", but he was hanged as a spy at Tappan, New York on 2 October 1780.

A religious poem was found in his pocket after his execution, written two days beforehand.

While a prisoner, he endeared himself to American officers who lamented his death as much as the British. Alexander Hamilton wrote of him: "Never perhaps did any man suffer death with more justice, or deserve it less." The day before his hanging, André drew a likeness of himself with pen and ink, which is now owned by Yale College. André, according to witnesses, placed the noose around his own neck.

Eyewitness account 
An eyewitness account of André's last day can be found in the book The American Revolution: From the Commencement to the Disbanding of the American Army Given in the Form of a Daily Journal, with the Exact Dates of all the Important Events; Also, a Biographical Sketch of the Most Prominent Generals by James Thacher, a surgeon in the American Revolutionary Army:
October 2d.-- Major André is no more among the living. I have just witnessed his exit. It was a tragical scene of the deepest interest. During his confinement and trial, he exhibited those proud and elevated sensibilities which designate greatness and dignity of mind. Not a murmur or a sigh ever escaped him, and the civilities and attentions bestowed on him were politely acknowledged. Having left a mother and two sisters in England, he was heard to mention them in terms of the tenderest affection, and in his letter to Sir Henry Clinton, he recommended them to his particular attention. The principal guard officer, who was constantly in the room with the prisoner, relates that when the hour of execution was announced to him in the morning, he received it without emotion, and while all present were affected with silent gloom, he retained a firm countenance, with calmness and composure of mind. Observing his servant enter the room in tears, he exclaimed, "Leave me till you can show yourself more manly!" His breakfast being sent to him from the table of General Washington, which had been done every day of his confinement, he partook of it as usual, and having shaved and dressed himself, he placed his hat upon the table, and cheerfully said to the guard officers, "I am ready at any moment, gentlemen, to wait on you." The fatal hour having arrived, a large detachment of troops was paraded, and an immense concourse of people assembled; almost all our general and field officers, excepting his excellency and staff, were present on horseback; melancholy and gloom pervaded all ranks, and the scene was affectingly awful. I was so near during the solemn march to the fatal spot, as to observe every movement, and participate in every emotion which the melancholy scene was calculated to produce.

Major André walked from the stone house, in which he had been confined, between two of our subaltern officers, arm in arm; the eyes of the immense multitude were fixed on him, who, rising superior to the fears of death, appeared as if conscious of the dignified deportment which he displayed. He betrayed no want of fortitude, but retained a complacent smile on his countenance, and politely bowed to several gentlemen whom he knew, which was respectfully returned. It was his earnest desire to be shot, as being the mode of death most conformable to the feelings of a military man, and he had indulged the hope that his request would be granted. At the moment, therefore, when suddenly he came in view of the gallows, he involuntarily started backward, and made a pause. "Why this emotion, sir?" said an officer by his side. Instantly recovering his composure, he said, "I am reconciled to my death, but I detest the mode." While waiting and standing near the gallows, I observed some degree of trepidation; placing his foot on a stone, and rolling it over and choking in his throat, as if attempting to swallow. So soon, however, as he perceived that things were in readiness, he stepped quickly into the wagon, and at this moment he appeared to shrink, but instantly elevating his head with firmness he said, "It will be but a momentary pang," and taking from his pocket two white handkerchiefs, the provost-marshal, with one, loosely pinioned his arms, and with the other, the victim, after taking off his hat and stock, bandaged his own eyes with perfect firmness, which melted the hearts and moistened the cheeks, not only of his servant, but of the throng of spectators. The rope being appended to the gallows, he slipped the noose over his head and adjusted it to his neck, without the assistance of the awkward executioner. Colonel Scammel now informed him that he had an opportunity to speak, if he desired it; he raised the handkerchief from his eyes, and said, "I pray you to bear me witness that I meet my fate like a brave man." The wagon being now removed from under him, he was suspended, and instantly expired; it proved indeed "but a momentary pang." He was dressed in his royal regimentals and boots, and his remains, in the same dress, were placed in an ordinary coffin, and interred at the foot of the gallows; and the spot was consecrated by the tears of thousands...

Aftermath

On the day of his capture, James Rivington published André's poem "The Cow Chase" in his gazette in New York. In the poem, André muses on his foiling of a foraging expedition in Bergen across the Hudson from the city. Nathan Strickland, André's executioner, who was confined at the camp in Tappan as a dangerous Tory during André's trial, was granted liberty for accepting the duty of hangman and returned to his home in the Ramapo Valley or Smith's Cove, and nothing further of him is known. Joshua Hett Smith, who was connected with André with the attempted treason, was also brought to trial at the Reformed Church of Tappan. The trial lasted four weeks and ended in acquittal for lack of evidence. The Colquhon brothers who were commanded by Benedict Arnold to bring André from the sloop-of-war Vulture to shore, as well as Major Keirs, under whose supervision the boat was obtained, were exonerated from all suspicion.

A pension was awarded by the British to his mother and three sisters not long after his death, and his brother William André was made a baronet in his honour in 1781 (see André baronets). In 1804 a memorial plaque by Charles Regnart was erected in the Grosvenor Chapel in London, to John's memory. In 1821, at the behest of the Duke of York, his remains, which had been buried under the gallows, were removed to England and placed among kings and poets at Westminster Abbey, in the nave, under a marble monument depicting Britannia mourning alongside a British lion over André's death. In 1879 a monument was unveiled on the place of his execution at Tappan.

The names of André's captors were John Paulding, David Williams, and Isaac Van Wert. The United States Congress gave each of them a silver medal, known as the Fidelity Medallion, and a pension of $200 a year. That came close to the annual pay of a Continental Army's infantry ensign in 1778. All were honoured in the names of counties in Ohio, and in 1853 a monument was erected to their memory on the place where they captured André. It was re-dedicated in 1880 and today is located in Patriot's Park on U.S. Route 9 along the boundary between Tarrytown and Sleepy Hollow in Westchester County. It was added to the National Register of Historic Places in 1982.
 "He was more unfortunate than criminal." – from a letter of George Washington to Comte de Rochambeau, 10 October 1780
 "An accomplished man and gallant officer." – from a letter written by Washington to Colonel John Laurens on 13 October 1780

In popular culture
The 1798 play André, based on Major André's execution, is one of the earliest examples of American tragedy. Clyde Fitch's play Major André opened on Broadway in November 1903, but was not a success, possibly because the play attempted to portray André as a sympathetic figure.

In Washington Irving's famous short story, The Legend of Sleepy Hollow, the townspeople describe the site of the capture of Major John André, in particular a tulip-tree, as one of the haunted locations in Sleepy Hollow. Ichabod Crane later passes the tree himself just before he encounters the Headless Horseman.

The young adult fiction book Sophia's War by Avi is about a young girl becoming a spy and foiling his plot.

André has been portrayed several times in film and television: by Michael Wilding as an eloquent and dignified idealist in the 1955 Hollywood film The Scarlet Coat; by JJ Feild in the TV series Turn: Washington's Spies; by William Beckley in season 4, episode 26 of the sci-fi TV series Voyage to the Bottom of the Sea; by Eric Joshua Davis in the TV series Sleepy Hollow; and by John Light in the movie Benedict Arnold: A Question of Honor.

André appears as a non-playable character in the 2012 video game Assassin's Creed III.

See also

 Intelligence in the American Revolutionary War
 John Champe (soldier)
 Jane Tuers

Notes

References

Bibliography

 An Authentic Narrative of the Causes Which Led to the Death of Major Andre, Adjutant-General of His Majesty's Forces in North America, Joshua Hett Smith (London 1808)
 Cray, Robert E. Jr., "Major John Andre and the Three Captors: Class Dynamics and Revolutionary Memory Wars in the Early Republic, 1780–1831", Journal of the Early Republic, Vol. 17, No. 3. Autumn, 1997. University of Pennsylvania Press.
 
 Memoirs of the Historical Society of Pennsylvania (1858), vol vi, which contains a comprehensive essay by Charles J. Biddle
 Andreana, H. W. Smith (Philadelphia, 1865)
 Two spies, Lossing (New York, 1886)
 Life and Career of Major John André, Sargent, new edition (New York, 1904)
 The Secret is Out: True Spy Stories, T. Martini (Boston, 1990)
 The Execution of MAJOR ANDRE, John Evangelist Walsh (New York, 2001)
 Local History: British Agent Detained in Tarrytown, Executed in Rockland

Further reading

External links

 "The Capture of Major John André" by A.C. Warren (1856)
 Letters from André, including coded interchange between André and Arnold
 More on his early life

1780 deaths
18th-century executions by the United States
18th-century executions by New York (state)
American Revolutionary War executions
British Army personnel of the American Revolutionary War
English people of French descent
Executed people from London
Burials at Westminster Abbey
British people executed abroad
British military personnel killed in the American Revolutionary War
Cameronians officers
Executed spies
Benedict Arnold
British spies during the American Revolution
Huguenot participants in the American Revolution
People executed by the United States military by hanging
Royal Welch Fusiliers officers
1750s births
People educated at St Paul's School, London